Marisa Belli (born 12 April 1933) is an Italian former actress.

Life and career 
Born in Rome, at young age Belli worked as an accountant and a secretary for several film production companies. After some experiences as a runway model, Belli was chosen by Pietro Germi for the role of Agrippina Solmo in Jealousy. Following a critical acclaim for her performance, she was subsequently able to similar roles, even though in more insignificant films.  

Starting from late 1950s Belli was mainly active on television and on stage, forming her own company in 1964.

Selected filmography  
 Jealousy (1953)
 The Awakening (1956)
 Serenata a Maria (1957)
 Seven in the Sun (1960)
 Hercules in the Haunted World (1961)
 L'onorata società (1961)
 Women of Devil's Island (1962)
 Disorder (1962)
 Avenger of the Seven Seas (1962)
 This Kind of Love (1972)
 Il corpo della ragassa (1979)

References

External links  
 

1933 births
Possibly living people
20th-century Italian actresses
Actresses from Rome
Italian film actresses
Italian stage actresses
Italian television actresses